IFAA may refer to:

 International Field Archery Association
 International Federation of Associations of Anatomists, a professional organization for human anatomists